Aliabadak is a village in Pishkuh Rural District, in the Central District of Taft County, Yazd Province, Iran. At the 2006 census, its population was 44, in 13 families.

References 

Populated places in Taft County